Gabriella Pession (born November 2, 1977) is an American-born Italian actress.

Biography 
Gabriella Pession was born in Florida. From 2013 to 2015 she starred in the TV show Crossing Lines. In 2015, she received the America Award from the Italy–USA Foundation.

Personal life 
In 2014 she had a son, Giulio, with her Crossing Lines co-star Richard Flood. They got married in 2016.

Filmography

Films

Television

Theater 
La verità vi prego sull'amore, directed by Francesco Apolloni (1998)
Storia d'amore e d'anarchia, directed by Lina Wertmüller (2002–03)

References

External links 

 

1977 births
Italian film actresses
American film actresses
Living people
Italian television actresses
American television actresses
Italian stage actresses
American stage actresses
20th-century Italian actresses
20th-century American actresses
21st-century Italian actresses
21st-century American actresses
People from Daytona Beach, Florida
Actresses from Florida